Neratov may refer to:

Places in the Czech Republic
Neratov (Pardubice District), a municipality and village in the Pardubice Region
Neratov (Bartošovice v Orlických horách), a hamlet and former municipality in the Hradec Králové Region

People
Anatoly Neratov, Russian diplomat